Skipwith Common is a national nature reserve south of Skipwith,  North Yorkshire, England. It is one of only three areas within the Vale of York that represent what the area was like before intensive agriculture took over. Natural England have described the reserve as having "international importance" on account of "its wet and dry heathland".

The site used to be common land, and has seen use in the Bronze Age, during the Early modern European period, when it was harvested for peat, and during the 20th century when it was partly incorporated into an airfield during the Second World War.

The site was given the designation of SSSI in 1958, SAC in 2004 and NNR in 2010.

History
It can be defined into two distinct areas; lowland heath and woodland. Part of the site is labelled as Danes Hill and was thought to have been where the Viking army buried their dead after their defeat at the Battle of Stamford Bridge.

The numerous ponds on the site are from the flax industry which flourished in the area around the 19th century. The working of flax required large ponds on even ground with a plentiful supply of freshwater streams to feed the ponds. The process for working flax is known as retting, and is normally located away from settlements due to the poisoning of the water supply. The site was also used to harvest peat for fuel throughout the 16th, 17th and 18th centuries, with York being a popular market for the peat. In 1903, the common was enclosed under the Enclosure Act, being the last major piece of common land in England to undergo this transformation.

In the 1940s, the south-western edge of the common was utilised by the Royal Air Force as the bomb storage location for the adjacent RAF Riccall airfield. After the Air Force departed in 1957, the site was rarely used and was subject to being overgrown with Betula (birch trees) as the common was not being actively managed. Sheep were introduced in 1983, which proved beneficial for keeping the scrub in check, but they were heavy-footed and so were replaced in 1986 with the Hebridean breed, which weigh a lot less than the Swaledale and Dalesbred breeds that were being used previously. The site is also grazed by English Longhorn cattle and Exmoor ponies.

The site was designated as a Site of Special Scientific Interest in 1958, because of its rich vegetation and are entomological species such as orgyia recens and chilodes maritima. In 2004, the site was confirmed as a Special Area of Conservation.

As part of the Selby Coalfield mining venture, the coal underneath the common was mined from 1997 onwards. Whilst there were some objections to this, RJB Mining countered that working the Stanley Main Seam was necessary as poor geological conditions in the Barnsley Seam led to the seeking alternatives.

Skipwith Common is representative of what a lowland heath would have looked like before the Vale of York was subject to intensive agriculture. A spokesperson for Natural England described the site as having "international importance for its wet and dry heathland." Skipwith Common is one of just three sites within the vale that are indicative of this lowland heath, the other two being Strensall Common and Allerthorpe Common. The common has a memorial to remember those who served at the RAF base during the Second World War.

The site is bounded on the west by the A19 road and to the south by the A163 road. Both provide access roads into the common with car parks on the common's edges.

Geology
The common lies on sands of the Breighton Sand Formation with peat on the surface. The underlying sand is thought to have been deposited during a glacial period when sediment was left here due to retreating ice and the flow of water over the Vale of York.

Trails
Skipwith Common has quite a wide area, and off the main paths, it is easy to get lost and trample the undergrowth, thereby disturbing wildlife, so three trails have been developed:
Bombs and Lizards - the shortest of the three at the western end of the common which takes the walker past the remnants of RAF Riccall's bomb dump, now home to a variety of reptiles
Hidden Archaeology - explores the history of the site
Skipwith Explorer - Takes in most of the other two trails with a diversion into the village of Skipwith itself

Description
According to the JNCC (Joint Nature Conservation Committee), the site can be broken down as follows:
55% - Heath, Scrub, Maquis and Garrigue, Phygrana
27% - Broad-leaved deciduous woodland 
5% - Bogs, Marshes, Water fringed vegetation, Fens 
5% - Dry grassland, Steppes 
5% - Inland water bodies (Standing water, Running water) 
3% - Mixed woodland

Species list
Broadleaved hellebore
Common twayblade
Common spotted orchid
Great crested newts
Nightjar
Pond mud snail
Pirri-pirri bur, an invasive Australasian plant, said to arrived on the common thanks to Antipodean airmen who served at RAF Riccall during the Second World War.
Round-leaved sundew
Woodlark
Water vole

Skipwith Common was one of the last places in Britain to have the Northern Mire Moss paludella squarrosa as part of its vegetation (1916), though the plant is believed to be extinct in Britain now.

References

Sources

External links

Friends of Skipwith Common website
NATURA 2000 – STANDARD DATA FORM Special Areas of Conservation under the EC Habitats Directive 
Natural England video, "The Nature of Flight", about Skipwith Common
SSSSI designation map

Sites of Special Scientific Interest in North Yorkshire
National nature reserves in England
Nature reserves in North Yorkshire
Selby District